Moliy is the stage name of Molly Ama Montgomery, a Ghanaian-American singer and songwriter. She rose to stardom after being featured on Amaarae 2020 single Sad Gurlz Luv Money remix with Kali Uchis which debuted at number 80 on the US Billboard Hot 100.

Originally from Accra, Ghana, Moliy was brought up in Accra and Florida.

In 2020, Moliy released her debut EP Wondergirl which cut across the shores of Ghana to gain airplay in The Gambia and Nigeria as well as Kenya.

References

External links 

 Official website

Living people
21st-century Ghanaian women singers
Ghanaian alté singers
Year of birth missing (living people)